New York Times Youth Forum was a public affairs program, sponsored by The New York Times and aired Sundays at 5pm EST on the now-defunct DuMont Television Network from September 14, 1952, to June 14, 1953. The host was Dorothy Gordon (born Dorothy Lerner, 1889–1970), who continued to host the show on WABD from the time the network closed in 1956 until 1958 when it moved to WRCA-TV (now WNBC).

The Times dropped sponsorship in 1960, at which point radio simulcasts moved from WQXR (AM) to WNBC (AM). Thereafter, Gordon continued the show as Dorothy Gordon's Youth Forum, winning a Peabody Award in 1966. Gordon continued to host the show until her death in 1970. The show also appeared first-run as late as April 23, 1967 (with guest Otto Preminger) on WNBC-TV.

Episode status
One episode, "Will the Election Affect Foreign Policy?" (broadcast September 28, 1952), survives at the Paley Center for Media.

See also
List of programs broadcast by the DuMont Television Network
List of surviving DuMont Television Network broadcasts
1952-53 United States network television schedule

References

Bibliography
David Weinstein, The Forgotten Network: DuMont and the Birth of American Television (Philadelphia: Temple University Press, 2004) 
Alex McNeil, Total Television, Fourth edition (New York: Penguin Books, 1980) 
Tim Brooks and Earle Marsh, The Complete Directory to Prime Time Network TV Shows, Third edition (New York: Ballantine Books, 1964) 
Charles Sopkin, Seven Glorious Days, Seven Fun-filled Nights, First edition (New York, Simon & Schuster, 1968, Library of Congress catalog card number 68-25754, pp. 64–66.

External links
New York Times Youth Forum at IMDB
DuMont historical website
University of Illinois Archives photo (James Reston collection, c. 1955) showing the panel with James Reston

DuMont Television Network original programming
1952 American television series debuts
1953 American television series endings
Black-and-white American television shows
DuMont news programming